The Dancing Master (first edition: The English Dancing Master) is a dancing manual containing the music and instructions for English country dances. It was first published in 1651 by John Playford.

History

It was published in several editions by John Playford and his successors from 1651 until . The first edition contained 105 dances with single-line melodies. The 1651 book The Dancing Master by John Playford had been designed for teaching dancing. It was originally small so that the dancing master could hide it under his cloak and consult it surreptitiously. Subsequent editions introduced new songs and dances, while dropping others, and the work eventually encompassed three volumes.

Dances from The Dancing Master were re-published in arrangements by Cecil Sharp in the early 20th century. In 1957 Margaret Dean Smith completed her facsimile book Playford's English Dancing Master.  This work had been the first publication of English dance tunes  and her publication established her as the expert on this work.

Dances from the book, in reconstructed forms, remain popular among dancers today. Early versions of the book are rare and command high prices.

Known editions and supplements

 1651 – 1st edition (the only edition to be called The English Dancing Master, published by John Playford)
 1652 – 2nd edition
 1657 – 3rd edition
 1665 – 3rd edition
 1670 – 4th edition
 1675 – 5th edition
 1679 – 6th edition
 1679 – A Supplement to The Dancing-Master
 1686 – 7th edition
 1687? – Tunes of other Country-Dances
 1688? – A new Additional Sheet to the Dancing-Master
 1689? – A new Addition to the Dancing-Master
 1690 – 8th edition (the first marked as published by Henry Playford)
 1695 – 9th edition
 1696 – The second Part of the Dancing Master
 1698 – The Second Part of the Dancing Master, 2nd edition
 1698? – [Untitled supplement]
 1698? – An Additional Sheet to the Second Part of the Dancing-Master
 1698 – 10th edition
 1701 – 11th edition
 1702 – Twenty Four New Country Dances. Printed by William Pearson for Henry Playford
 1703 – 12th edition
 1706 – 13th edition (the first edition published by John Young)
 1709 – 14th edition
 1710? – Vol. the second, 1st edition
 1713 – 15th edition
 1714? – Vol. the second, 2nd edition
 1716 – 16th edition
 1718 – Vol. the second, 3rd edition
 1721 – Vol. the first, 17th edition
 c1726 – The Third Volume, 2nd edition
 c1728 – Vol. the first, 18th edition
 1728 – Vol. the second, 4th edition

See also
 Jig (theatre)

References

External links

 , scans of the first to tenth editions (1651-1698), and the 14th edition (1704)
 Playford’s Dancing Master: The Compleat Dance Guide "An exhaustive collection, catalogue, and index of all dances published in editions of the Dancing Master, 1651-1728", Scott Pfitzinger, CC-BY-NC-SA. Contains modernized scores and dance directions.
 The Dancing Master, 1651–1728: An Illustrated Compendium, by Robert M Keller, a comprehensive scholarly database allowing comparisons across all versions of Playford's work
 First edition
 Second edition
 Tenth edition, facsimile at Library of Congress
 What are Playford dances? by Hugh Stewart, The Round, Cambridge University English Country Dance Club

1651 books
English music
Dance education
Renaissance dance
Music books
Baroque dance